Ash Mountain is the highest summit in the Tuya Range of the Stikine Ranges in northcentral British Columbia, Canada, located immediately north of High Tuya Lake at the north end of Tuya Mountains Provincial Park. It is one of the six tuyas clustered close to Tuya Lake. The base of the volcano comprises pillow lava and hyaloclastite indicating that the volcano formed beneath ice or under a large lake. The volcano comprises loose debris as well as dikes of basaltic rock that intruded into the volcanic pile. Other tuyas in the area include Tuya Butte, South Tuya and Mathews Tuya, although most of the group of tuyas are unnamed.

See also
List of subglacial volcanoes
Volcanism of Western Canada
Volcanic history of the Northern Cordilleran Volcanic Province

References

Volcanoes of British Columbia
Two-thousanders of British Columbia
Stikine Ranges
Subglacial mounds of Canada
Northern Cordilleran Volcanic Province
Cassiar Country
Monogenetic volcanoes
Pleistocene volcanoes
Pleistocene North America
Quaternary British Columbia